Ziziphus hutchinsonii is a species of tree in the family Rhamnaceae. It is endemic to the Philippines.

References

hutchinsonii
Endemic flora of the Philippines
Trees of the Philippines
Vulnerable plants
Taxonomy articles created by Polbot
Taxa named by Elmer Drew Merrill